Indirect presidential elections were held in Finland in 1946. In 1944 the Parliament had passed a law that enabled Carl Gustaf Emil Mannerheim to serve a six-year term. However, he resigned on 4 March 1946, giving as his reason his declining health and his view that the tasks he had been selected to carry out had been accomplished. An election was held in Parliament to appoint his successor. Juho Kusti Paasikivi was elected with 159 of the 200 votes.
Mannerheim had suffered from poor health since 1945, and he had vacationed abroad (chiefly in Portugal) from November 1945 to January 1946.  He had been concerned about the possibility of being indicted for abusing his office as the Commander-in-Chief of the Finnish army when approving of Finland's participation in the Continuation War (1941–1944) against the Soviet Union, and in an informal military alliance with Germany.  He was not indicted, but eight leading wartime Finnish politicians were, and Mannerheim stayed abroad, mainly in Portugal, and on sick leave in the Red Cross's hospital in Helsinki from November 1945 to March 1946, to remain on the political background during the "war guilt" trial.  Paasikivi was regarded by many Finnish politicians as the only realistic successor of Mannerheim, given his long diplomatic and foreign policy experience.  Because many Karelian refugees would not yet have been able to vote in regular Finnish presidential elections until the autumn of 1946, due to their frequent changes of home town, the Finnish Parliament decided to pass an exceptional law to elect the new President.  Former President K.J. Ståhlberg was not an official presidential candidate, but he received 14 sympathy votes in these presidential elections, because a few Finnish parliamentarians respected his preference for regular presidential elections.

Results

References

Presidential elections in Finland
President
Finland